Cervia Air Base  is an air base of the Italian Air Force (Aeronautica Militare). It was the home of the 5th Fighter Wing, which flew leased US Air Force Lockheed Martin F-16 Falcon. It is also a NATO air base and is visited by other NATO air forces on a routine basis. After Italy returned the leased F-16 to the US Air Force the 5th Fighter Wing was disbanded and in its place the 1st Special Air Brigade moved to Cervia. Along with the 1st Special Air Brigade arrived the 15th CSAR Wing - the Italian air force's Combat Search and Rescue wing.

History
During World War II the airfield was used by the United States Army Air Force Twelfth Air Force 79th Fighter Group, flying combat operations with P-47 Thunderbolts.  The 79th used the airfield from 20 March until July 1945. The airfield was also used by the RAF's 112 Squadron late in World War II, from February 1945 to May 1945. The 15 Squadron SAAF also used this air field from December 1944 until May 1945.

Facilities
The airport resides at an elevation of 5 m above mean sea level.

See also

List of airports in Italy

References

External links
 
 

Aeronautica Militare
Italian airbases
Airfields of the United States Army Air Forces in Italy